Sneha Wagh (born 4 October 1987) is an Indian television actress known for playing the role of Jyoti in Imagine TV's show Jyoti. She played the role of Moora in the show Chandragupt Maurya telecasted on Sony TV. She portrayed the character of Ratan Kaur Sampooran Singh on Ek Veer Ki Ardaas...Veera. In 2021, she participated in Marathi reality show  Bigg Boss Marathi 3.

Early life
Wagh did her graduation in Bachelor of Science and has done filmmaking course from London Film Academy and is a film director.

Personal life
She was married with Avishkar Darwhekar in 2007 but later divorced and again she married with Anurag Solanki in 2015 but again divorced in 2016.

Career
Sneha started her career at the age of 13 in Marathi theatre. Her first television show was Adhuri Ek Kahani where she played the role of Arpita on Zee Marathi. She went on star in a Marathi serial titled Kaata Rute Kunala where she played the lead role. With more Marathi shows like Adhuri Ek Kahaani she had gained much popularity within the regional audiences. She made her Hindi television debut with Imagine TV's show Jyoti, where she played the lead role of Jyoti. She played the role of Ratanjeet Sampooran Singh in Ek Veer Ki Ardaas...Veera on Star Plus. In 2021, she participated in Bigg Boss Marathi 3.

Television

References

External links

http://timesofindia.indiatimes.com/tv/news/hindi/Sneha-Waghs-second-marriage-on-the-rocks/articleshow/52326532.cms

Living people
Indian television actresses
Indian soap opera actresses
Place of birth missing (living people)
1987 births
Bigg Boss Marathi contestants